Fak Tha Wittaya School (F.T.W.) is a high school in Fak Tha District, Uttaradit, Thailand.

School's emblem
 Elephant, representing community relations and a school that collaborates in education.
 Candle, representing glory and success by combining the power of education between communities and school.

School's colours
 Purple
 Green is the exuberance of the tree, as the knowledge grows.

School's Tree
 Bodhi Tree

List of directors

References

External links 
Website 
Facebook page 

Schools in Thailand
Schools in Uttaradit Province
Educational institutions established in 1974
Buildings and structures in Uttaradit province
1974 establishments in Thailand